The European Long Course Championships 1999 were a swimming competition held in Istanbul, Turkey from Monday 26 July to Sunday 1 August, in the 50 m pool of the Ataköy Olympic Pool Stadium. The 24th edition of the event was organised by the LEN.

The Istanbul championships resulted in two world and eight European records.

Alongside swimming (long course), the aquatics disciplines of diving, synchronised swimming and open water swimming were held. Water polo was no longer part of the LEN European Aquatics Championships from 1999 and separate European Water Polo Championship was held in Florence, Italy.

For the first time, the 50 m backstroke, breaststroke and butterfly were contested.

Medal table

Swimming

Men's events

Women's events

Open water swimming

Men's events

Women's events

Diving

Men's events

Women's events

Synchronized swimming

See also
1999 Men's European Water Polo Championship
1999 Women's European Water Polo Championship

External links
Results

European Aquatics Championships, 1999
European Aquatics
LEN European Aquatics Championships
1999
Sports competitions in Istanbul
Swimming competitions in Turkey
Diving competitions in Turkey
July 1999 sports events in Turkey
August 1999 sports events in Turkey
1990s in Istanbul